Timothy Detudamo (died 11 April 1953) was a Nauruan politician and linguist. He served as Head Chief of Nauru from 1930 until his death in 1953.

Biography
Detudamo was born in Uaboe District. He was a layman of the Protestant Church of Nauru during his youth, and became assistant to the missionary Rev. Phillip Delaporte to be his assistant. In 1917, he was chosen to travel to the United States by Rev Delaporte to translate the Bible into the Nauruan language. To finance the travel, Detudamo needed US$500, which he raised through Nauruan donations. His translation was carried out with the help of Rev Delaporte, a German-American missionary. Detudamo returned to Nauru in 1921. In 1938, he tried to reform the Nauruan language by making it more understandable for Europeans and Americans. However, his reforms were not widely adopted and today the old orthography continues to be more common.

In November 1930 Detudamo was appointed Head Chief of Nauru by Administrator William Augustin Newman following the death of Daimon. He held the office until 1942 when Japan invaded and occupied the island. During the Japanese occupation, Detudamo served as Governor of Nauru until 30 June 1943 when he was deported along with most of the Nauruan population to Chuuk in Micronesia. On 31 January 1946 he returned to Nauru and was duly re-elected to the position of Head Chief. Following the introduction of a Nauru Local Government Council in 1951 Detudamo was elected as a councillor for the Districts of Denigomodu, Nibok, Uaboe, and Baitsi. He was also re-elected as Head Chief by the NLGC 

Detudamo also helped establish the first Nauruan large enterprise, a Nauruan land owners co-operative general store. It was called the Nauru Cooperative Society and adopted the name 'Eigigu' in symbolically depicting the Nauruan "Lady on the Moon" legend.

Detudamo died in Sydney in Australia on 11 April 1953 at the age of 65, and was succeeded as Head Chief by Raymond Gadabu. His son Buraro later served as an MP and minister.

References

Year of birth missing
People from Uaboe District
Nauruan Christians
Head Chiefs of Nauru
Linguists from Nauru
Translators to Nauruan
Nauruan religious leaders
People deported from Nauru
1953 deaths
20th-century Nauruan politicians